Mikhail Shchadov (1927–2011) was a Russian engineer who served as the minister of coal industry between 15 December 1985 and 24 August 1991, being the last Soviet minister to hold the post.

Early life and education
Shchadov was born in the village of Kamenka, Irkutsk Oblast on 14 November 1927. He graduated from Tomsk Polytechnic Institute majoring in mining engineering in 1953. He also graduated from the All-Union Financial and Economic Correspondence Institute with a degree in economics in 1965. The same year he also graduated from the Higher Party School which was attached to the central committee of the Communist Party.

Career
Shchadov began his career at the age of 15 working in a mine in Cheremkhovo as a site manager. Then he became the chief engineer and head of a mine. Next he was named as the manager of a trust, Mamslyuda, in 1961 which he held until 1963. From 1966 he worked at the Vostsibugol plant as deputy head and then head of the plant.He was made the general director of the Vostsibugol production association. In 1977 he was appointed deputy minister of coal industry and in 1981 first deputy minister. He was named the minister of coal industry on 15 December 1985, replacing Boris F. Bratchenko in the post. Shchadov served in the cabinet led by Nikolai Ryzhkov. 

Shchadov's term was extended in March 1989. Just four days after this the mine workers started a large-scale strike. He remained in office until 24 August 1991 when he was fired due to his support for the coup against Mikhail Gorbachev. However, two months later in October 1991 Shchadov was appointed chairman of the board of the Credit Bank of Moscow.

Party career
Shchadov joined the Communist Party in 1947. He became a deputy at the Supreme Soviet in the 11th convocation and was a member of the Communist Party's central committee in the period 1986–1990.

In popular culture
Shchadov was portrayed in Chernobyl, TV mini series, dated 2019, but the show lowered his age and depth of experience in the coal industry for dramatic purposes.

References

External links

20th-century Russian engineers
1927 births
2011 deaths
Central Committee of the Communist Party of the Soviet Union members
Eleventh convocation members of the Supreme Soviet of the Soviet Union
Members of the Supreme Soviet of Russia
Mining engineers
People from Irkutsk Oblast
People's commissars and ministers of the Soviet Union
Soviet economists
Soviet engineers
Tomsk Polytechnic University alumni